Jennifer R. Niebyl (1942) is a Canadian obstetrics and gynecology researcher and professor. She has made significant contributions to the understanding of drugs in pregnancy and lactation.

Early life and education
Niebyl was born prematurely in 1942 in Montreal, Canada, due to high risks in her mother's pregnancy, who had already suffered five miscarriages.

Niebyl completed her undergrad and earned a Bachelors of Science in a nursing program at McGill University in Montreal, Quebec, Canada. After McGill, she attended Yale University School of Medicine in New Haven, Connecticut, earning her M.D. in 1967. She specialized in obstetrics and gynecology and after struggling to find somewhere to accept her due to her gender, she was accepted and performed her residency from 1968 to 1970 at Cornell University-New York Hospital, in Ithaca, New York, and then from 1970 to 1973 at Johns Hopkins Hospital in Baltimore, Maryland.

Career 
In 1982, Johns Hopkins promoted Niebyl as the director of the division of maternal-fetal medicine. Niebyl specializes in high risk obstetrics, focusing on medical drug use in pregnancy, tocolytic agents for preterm labor, nutrition in pregnancy, nausea and vomiting during pregnancy, and folic acid for prevention of birth defect. According to Niebyl, she studied medicine in order to "make the decisions that can really help people," and "to be in charge of the decision-making process for the health care of women."

Niebyl is currently employed at the  Roy J. and Lucille A. Carver College of Medicine, University of Iowa in Iowa City, Iowa, where she is a professor and heads the Department of Obstetrics and Gynecology. Niebyl is one of the first few women in the United States to ever become the head of this type of department. Niebyl is certified by the American Board of Obstetrics & Gynecology.

Memberships and affiliations 
Niebyl is a member of:

The Society for Gynecologic Investigation (president from 2001 to 2001)
The Society for Maternal-Fetal Medince (where she is on the board of directors)
 The American Gynecological and Obstetrical Society
 The Institute of Medicine, National Academy of Sciences (elected in 1997)
Johns Hopkins Society of Scholars (elected in 1997)
 The American Board of Obstetrics and Gynecology (examiner since 1984)

The following committees are some that Niebyl has served on:

 Food and Drug Administration Fertility and Maternal Health Drugs Advisory Committee (1988-1993)
 U.S. Pharmacopeia Obstetrics and Gynecology Expert Committee
 The American College of Obstetricians and Gynecologists
 Committee on Obstetrics: Maternal-Fetal Medicine
 The Education Commission
  Health Care Commission

Select bibliography 
Niebyl has written many scientific articles, review articles, and chapters.

Books 

Drug Use in Pregnancy (1988, as editor)
Obstetrics: Normal and Problem Pregnancies (1988, co-editor)

Contributions 

 Teratology and Drugs in Pregnancy (2008, Global Library of Women's Medicine, with Joe Leigh Simpson)
 Conception and Prenatal Development (2009, The Merck Manual Professional Edition)
 Strategies to Treat Nausea and Vomiting During Pregnancy (2011, Physician's Weekly)
 Drugs and Environmental Agents in Pregnancy and Lactation: Embryology, Teratology, Epidemiology (2012, Obstetrics: Normal and Problem Pregnancies 6th edition)

Journals 

The American Journal of Perinatology (co-editor-in-chief)
Journal of the Society for Gynecologic Investigation (associate editor)

Other 

Perspectives on Hyperemesis Gravidarum (podcast)

References

1942 births
Living people
Canadian women non-fiction writers
Women gynaecologists
Canadian women physicians
Yale School of Medicine alumni
Roy J. and Lucille A. Carver College of Medicine faculty
Members of the National Academy of Medicine